"Pretty Mess" is a 1984 song released by Canadian singer Vanity. The song was the lead single in support of her debut studio solo album, Wild Animal on Motown Records. The single peaked at No. 15 on the Hot Black Singles and No. 13 on the Hot Dance Club Play charts in Billboard Magazine.

Track listing
US 7" Single

UK 7" Single

Charts

References

1984 debut singles
Vanity (singer) songs
Songs written by Vanity (singer)
1984 songs
Motown singles